The Mukden Incident, or Manchurian Incident, known in Chinese as the 9.18 Incident (九・一八), was a false flag event staged by Japanese military personnel as a pretext for the 1931 Japanese invasion of Manchuria.

On September 18, 1931, Lieutenant Suemori Kawamoto of the Independent Garrison Unit  of the 29th Japanese Infantry Regiment detonated a small quantity of dynamite close to a railway line owned by Japan's South Manchuria Railway near Mukden (now Shenyang). The explosion was so weak that it failed to destroy the track, and a train passed over it minutes later. The Imperial Japanese Army accused Chinese dissidents of the act and responded with a full invasion that led to the occupation of Manchuria, in which Japan established its puppet state of Manchukuo six months later. The deception was exposed by the Lytton Report of 1932, leading Japan to diplomatic isolation and its March 1933 withdrawal from the League of Nations.

The bombing act is known as the Liutiao Lake Incident (Japanese: , Ryūjōko-jiken), and the entire episode of events is known in Japan as the Manchurian Incident (Kyūjitai: , Shinjitai: , Manshū-jihen) and in China as the September 18 Incident.

Background

Japanese economic presence and political interest in Manchuria had been growing ever since the end of the Russo-Japanese War (1904–1905). The Treaty of Portsmouth that ended the war had granted Japan the lease of the South Manchuria Railway branch (from Changchun to Lüshun) of the China Far East Railway. The Japanese government, however, claimed that this control included all the rights and privileges that China granted to Russia in the 1896 Li–Lobanov Treaty, as enlarged by the Kwantung Lease Agreement of 1898. This included absolute and exclusive administration within the South Manchuria Railway Zone. Japanese railway guards were stationed within the zone to provide security for the trains and tracks; however, these were regular Japanese soldiers, and they frequently carried out maneuvers outside the railway areas.

Meanwhile, the newly formed Chinese government was trying to reassert its authority over the country after over a decade of fragmented warlord dominance. They started to claim that treaties between China and Japan were invalid. China also announced new acts, so the Japanese people (including Koreans and Taiwanese as both regions were under Japanese rule at this time) who had settled frontier lands, opened stores or built their own houses in China were expelled without any compensation. Manchurian warlord Zhang Zuolin tried to deprive Japanese concessions too, but he was assassinated by the Japanese Kwantung Army. Chang Hsueh-liang, Zhang's son and successor, joined the Nanjing Government led by Chiang Kai-shek from anti-Japanese sentiment. Official Japanese objections to the oppression against Japanese nationals within China were rejected by the Chinese authorities.

The 1929 Sino-Soviet conflict (July–November) over the Chinese Eastern Railroad (CER) further increased the tensions in the Northeast that would lead to the Mukden Incident. The Soviet Red Army victory over Chang Hsueh-liang's forces not only reasserted Soviet control over the CER in Manchuria but revealed Chinese military weaknesses that Japanese Kwantung Army officers were quick to note.

The Soviet Red Army performance also stunned Japanese officials. Manchuria was central to Japan's East Asia policy. Both the 1921 and 1927 Imperial Eastern Region Conferences reconfirmed Japan's commitment to be the dominant power in Manchuria. The 1929 Red Army victory shook that policy to the core and reopened the Manchurian problem. By 1930, the Kwantung Army realized they faced a Red Army that was only growing stronger. The time to act was drawing near and Japanese plans to conquer the Northeast were accelerated.

In April 1931, a national leadership conference of China was held between Chiang Kai-shek and Chang Hsueh-liang in Nanking. They agreed to put aside their differences and assert China's sovereignty in Manchuria strongly. On the other hand, some officers of the Kwantung Army began to plot to invade Manchuria secretly. There were other officers who wanted to support plotters in Tokyo.

Events

Believing that a conflict in Manchuria would be in the best interests of Japan, Kwantung Army Colonel Seishirō Itagaki and Lieutenant Colonel Kanji Ishiwara independently devised a plan to prompt Japan to invade Manchuria by provoking an incident from Chinese forces stationed nearby. However, after the Japanese Minister of War Jirō Minami dispatched Major General Yoshitsugu Tatekawa to Manchuria for the specific purpose of curbing the insubordination and militarist behavior of the Kwantung Army, Itagaki and Ishiwara knew that they no longer had the luxury of waiting for the Chinese to respond to provocations, but had to stage their own.

Itagaki and Ishiwara chose to sabotage the rail section in an area near Liutiao Lake (liǔtiáohú). The area had no official name and was not militarily important, but it was only eight hundred meters away from the Chinese garrison of Beidaying (běidàyíng), where troops under the command of the "Young Marshal" Chang Hsueh-liang were stationed. The Japanese plan was to attract Chinese troops by an explosion and then blame them for having caused the disturbance in order to provide a pretext for a formal Japanese invasion. In addition, they intended to make the sabotage appear more convincing as a calculated Chinese attack on an essential target, thereby making the expected Japanese reaction appear as a legitimate measure to protect a vital railway of industrial and economic importance. The Japanese press labeled the site "Liǔtiáo Ditch" (liǔtiáogōu) or "Liǔtiáo Bridge" (liǔtiáoqiáo), when in reality, the site was a small railway section laid on an area of flat land. The choice to place the explosives at this site was to preclude the extensive rebuilding that would have been necessitated had the site actually been a railway bridge.

Incident

Colonel Seishirō Itagaki, Lieutenant Colonel Kanji Ishiwara, Colonel Kenji Doihara, and Major Takayoshi Tanaka had completed plans for the incident by May 31, 1931.

The plan was executed when 1st Lieutenant Suemori Kawamoto of the Independent Garrison Unit (獨立守備隊) of the 29th Infantry Regiment, which guarded the South Manchuria Railway, placed explosives near the tracks, but far enough away to do no real damage. At around 10:20 pm (22:20), September 18, the explosives were detonated. However, the explosion was minor and only a 1.5-meter section on one side of the rail was damaged. In fact, a train from Changchun passed by the site on this damaged track without difficulty and arrived in Shenyang at 10:30 pm (22:30).

Invasion of Manchuria

On the morning of September 19, two artillery pieces installed at the Mukden officers' club opened fire on the Chinese garrison nearby, in response to the alleged Chinese attack on the railway. Chang Hsueh-liang's small air force was destroyed, and his soldiers fled their destroyed Beidaying barracks, as five hundred Japanese troops attacked the Chinese garrison of around seven thousand. The Chinese troops were no match for the experienced Japanese troops. By the evening, the fighting was over, and the Japanese had occupied Mukden at the cost of five hundred Chinese lives and only two Japanese lives.

At Dalian in the Kwantung Leased Territory, Commander-in-Chief of the Kwantung Army General Shigeru Honjō was at first appalled that the invasion plan was enacted without his permission, but he was eventually convinced by Ishiwara to give his approval after the act. Honjō moved the Kwantung Army headquarters to Mukden and ordered General Senjuro Hayashi of the Chosen Army of Japan in Korea to send in reinforcements. At 04:00 on 19 September, Mukden was declared secure.

Chang Hsueh-liang personally ordered his men not to put up a fight and to store away any weapons when the Japanese invaded. Therefore, the Japanese soldiers proceeded to occupy and garrison the major cities of Changchun and Antung and their surrounding areas with minimal difficulty. However, in November, General Ma Zhanshan, the acting governor of Heilongjiang, began resistance with his provincial army, followed in January by Generals Ting Chao and Li Du with their local Jilin provincial forces. Despite this resistance, within five months of the Mukden Incident, the Imperial Japanese Army had overrun all major towns and cities in the provinces of Liaoning, Jilin, and Heilongjiang.

Aftermath
Chinese public opinion strongly criticized Chang Hsueh-liang for his non-resistance to the Japanese invasion. While the Japanese presented a real threat, the Kuomintang directed most of their efforts towards eradication of the communist party. Many charged that Chang's Northeastern Army of nearly a quarter million could have withstood the Kwantung Army of only 11,000 men. In addition, his arsenal in Manchuria was considered the most modern in China, and his troops had possession of tanks, around 60 combat aircraft, 4000 machine guns, and four artillery battalions.

Chang Hsueh-liang's seemingly superior force was undermined by several factors. The first was that the Kwantung Army had a strong reserve force that could be transported by railway from Korea, which was a Japanese colony, directly adjacent to Manchuria. Secondly, more than half of Chang's troops were stationed south of the Great Wall in Hebei Province, while the troops north of the wall were scattered throughout Manchuria. Therefore, deploying Chang's troops north of the Great Wall meant that they lacked the concentration needed to fight the Japanese effectively. Most of Chang's troops were under-trained, poorly led, poorly fed, and had poor morale and questionable loyalty compared to their Japanese counterparts. Japanese secret agents had permeated Chang's command because of his and his father Zhang Zuolin's past reliance on Japanese military advisers. The Japanese knew the Northeastern Army very well and were able to conduct operations with ease.

The Chinese government was preoccupied with numerous internal problems, including the issue of the newly independent Guangzhou government of Hu Hanmin, Communist Party of China insurrections, and terrible flooding of the Yangtze River that created tens of thousands of refugees. Moreover, Chang himself was not in Manchuria at the time, but was in a hospital in Beijing to raise money for the flood victims. However, in the Chinese newspapers, Chang was ridiculed as "General Nonresistance".

Because of these circumstances, the central government turned to the international community for a peaceful resolution. The Chinese Foreign Ministry issued a strong protest to the Japanese government and called for the immediate stop to Japanese military operations in Manchuria, and appealed to the League of Nations, on September 19. On  October 24, the League of Nations passed a resolution mandating the withdrawal of Japanese troops, to be completed by 16 November. However, Japan rejected the League of Nations resolution and insisted on direct negotiations with the Chinese government. Negotiations went on intermittently without much result.

On November 20, a conference in the Chinese government was convened, but the Guangzhou faction of the Kuomintang insisted that Chiang Kai-shek step down to take responsibility for the Manchurian debacle. On December 15, Chiang resigned as the Chairman of the Nationalist Government and was replaced as Premier of the Republic of China (head of the Executive Yuan) by Sun Fo, son of Sun Yat-sen. Jinzhou, another city in Liaoning, was lost to the Japanese in early January 1932. As a result, Wang Jingwei replaced Sun Fo as the Premier.

On January 7, 1932, United States Secretary of State Henry Stimson issued his Stimson Doctrine, that the United States would not recognize any government that was established as the result of Japanese actions in Manchuria. On January 14, a League of Nations commission, headed by Victor Bulwer-Lytton, 2nd Earl of Lytton, disembarked at Shanghai to examine the situation. In March, the puppet state of Manchukuo was established, with the former emperor of China, Puyi, installed as head of state.

On October 2, the Lytton Report was published and rejected the Japanese claim that the Manchurian invasion and occupation was an act of self-defense, although it did not assert that the Japanese had perpetrated the initial bombing of the railroad. The report ascertained that Manchukuo was the product of Japanese military aggression in China, while recognizing that Japan had legitimate concerns in Manchuria because of its economic ties there. The League of Nations refused to acknowledge Manchukuo as an independent nation. Japan resigned from the League of Nations in March 1933.

Colonel Kenji Doihara used the Mukden Incident to continue his campaign of disinformation. Since the Chinese troops at Mukden had put up such poor resistance, he told Manchukuo Emperor Puyi that this was proof that the Chinese remained loyal to him. Japanese intelligence used the incident to continue the campaign to discredit the murdered Zhang Zuolin and his son Chang Hsueh-liang for "misgovernment" of Manchuria. In fact, drug trafficking and corruption had largely been suppressed under Zhang Zuolin.

Controversy

Different opinions still exist as to who caused the explosion on the Japanese railroad at Mukden. Strong evidence points to young officers of the Japanese Kwantung Army having conspired to cause the blast, with or without direct orders from Tokyo. Post-war investigations confirmed that the original bomb planted by the Japanese failed to explode, and a replacement had to be planted. The resulting explosion enabled the Japanese Kwantung Army to accomplish their goal of triggering a conflict with Chinese troops stationed in Manchuria and the subsequent establishment of the puppet state of Manchukuo.

The 9.18 Incident Exhibition Museum (九・一八歷史博物館) at Shenyang, opened by the People's Republic of China on September 18, 1991, takes the position that the explosives were planted by Japan. The Yūshūkan museum, located within Yasukuni Shrine in Tokyo, also places the blame on members of the Kwantung Army.

David Bergamini's book Japan's Imperial Conspiracy (1971) has a detailed chronology of events in both Manchuria and Tokyo surrounding the Mukden Incident. Bergamini concludes that the greatest deception was that the Mukden Incident and Japanese invasion were planned by junior or hot-headed officers, without formal approval by the Japanese government. However, historian James Weland has concluded that senior commanders had tacitly allowed field operatives to proceed on their own initiative, then endorsed the result after a positive outcome was assured.

In August 2006, the Yomiuri Shimbun, Japan's top-selling newspaper, published the results of a year-long research project into the general question of who was responsible for the "Shōwa war". With respect to the Manchurian Incident, the newspaper blamed ambitious Japanese militarists, as well as politicians who were impotent to rein them in or prevent their insubordination.

Debate has also focused on how the incident was handled by the League of Nations and the subsequent Lytton Report. A. J. P. Taylor wrote that "In the face of its first serious challenge", the League buckled and capitulated. The Washington Naval Conference (1921) guaranteed a certain degree of Japanese hegemony in East Asia. Any intervention on the part of America would be a breach of the already mentioned agreement. Furthermore, Britain was in crisis, having been recently forced off the gold standard. Although a power in East Asia at the time, Britain was incapable of decisive action. The only response from these powers was "moral condemnation".

Remembrance
Each year at 10:00 am on 18 September, air-raid sirens sound for several minutes in numerous major cities across China. Provinces include Heilongjiang, Jilin, Liaoning, Hainan, and others.

In popular culture

 The Mukden Incident is depicted in The Adventures of Tintin comic The Blue Lotus, although the book places the bombing near Shanghai. Here it is performed by Japanese agents and the Japanese exaggerate the incident.
 The Chinese patriotic song Along the Songhua River describes the lives of the people who had lost their homeland in Northeast China after the Mukden Incident.
 In Akira Kurosawa's 1946 film No Regrets for Our Youth, the subject of the Mukden Incident is debated.
 See also Junji Kinoshita's play A Japanese Called Otto, which opens with the characters discussing the Mukden Incident.
 The 2010 Japanese anime Night Raid 1931 is a 13-episode spy/pulp series set in 1931 Shanghai and Manchuria. Episode 7, "Incident", specifically covers the Mukden Incident.
 The violent manga Gantz has a reference when an elder says that an occurrence reminds him of the "Manchurian Incident".
 Dutch death metal band Hail of Bullets covers the event in the song "The Mukden Incident" on their 2010 album On Divine Winds, a concept album about the Pacific Ocean theatre of World War II.
 The television drama Kazoku Game deals with the history textbook controversy in episode 4, mentioning the Mukden Incident.
 The 1969 novel Black Rain by Masuji Ibuse mentions the incident on numerous occasions.

See also 

 Events preceding World War II in Asia
 Jinan incident (May 1928)
 Huanggutun incident (Japanese assassination of the Chinese head of state Generalissimo Zhang Zuolin on 4 June 1928)
 Northeast Flag Replacement (by Zhang Xueliang on 29 December 1928)
 Second Sino-Japanese War
 Japanese invasion of Manchuria (1931)
 January 28 Incident (Shanghai, 1932)
 Defense of the Great Wall (1933)
 Marco Polo Bridge Incident (7 July 1937)
 History of Sino-Japanese relations#Second Sino-Japanese War and World War II
 History of the Republic of China
 Military of the Republic of China
 National Revolutionary Army

References

Citations

Sources 

 
 
 
 
 Lucas, David G. Strategic Disharmony: Japan, Manchuria, and Foreign Policy (Air War College, 1995) online.
 
 Ogata, Sadako N. Defiance in Manchuria: the making of Japanese foreign policy, 1931-1932 (U of California Press, 1964).
 Yoshihashi, Takehiko. Conspiracy at Mukden: the rise of the Japanese military (Yale UP, 1963) online
 Wright, Quincy (1932-02). "The Manchurian Crisis". American Political Science Review. 26 (1): 45–76.

External links
 World War II Database- Manchurian Incident
 Article on Japanese military cliques and their involvement in The Mukden Incident from Japanese Press Translations 1945–46

Conflicts in 1931
Conflicts in 1932
Battles of the Second Sino-Japanese War
Combat incidents
False flag operations
1931 in China
1932 in China
History of Manchuria
1931 in Japan
1932 in Japan
League of Nations
Acts of sabotage